Azlina binti Abdul Aziz (born 6 June 1962) is a Malaysian singer and actress. She is the daughter of an acting-singing couple named Normadiah and Aziz Jaafar. She began her career in 1979, with a soundtrack album, Dunia Ana Yang Punya.

She has a younger sister named Liza Aziz, also a well-known singer. She was previously married to Azman Abu Hassan, a musician and brother of the late composer, Dato' Adnan Abu Hassan in 1992, but divorced in 2010.

Early involvement in the art world 
Her artistic career began when she became involved as a dancer in the Normadiah Dancer's group under the leadership of his mother. She often appeared as an accompanist when artists performed in television entertainment programs produced by Radio Television Malaysia (RTM) around the end of the 70s. She also had the opportunity to perform in public when she always followed his parents when attending entertainment events. In addition, she was also given the opportunity to appear as an additional actress in films involving her parents at that time. Among the films in question are Sumpah Semerah Padi, Dendang Perantau and so on.

However, her career began to grow when she got an offer to act from director Aziz Sattar in the movie Prebet Lapok as the lover of A. R. Badul. This film was released in 1979. Apart from acting, she also had the opportunity to showcase her singing talent more widely when her also sang a song based on Kassim Masdor's quote.

She was also chosen by director Omar Rojik to play the role of heroine to R. Jaafar in the film Si Luncai in 1980. However, her involvement as an actor was seen to be very limited. Most of her acting films are light with only comedic stories.

She was also offered to play the main role in a private drama produced by Sabah Film Productions called Layang-Layang Terputus Talinya. But, she has rejected it for certain reasons. Finally, the role was given to actress Maria Arshad.

In addition, the soundtrack album from the movie Dunia Ana Yang Punya also brings together songs from the movie Penyamun Tarbus and Detik 12 Malam. This soundtrack album is also marketed to the public by Indra Record Company. In terms of documentation, the first song he ever recorded in the form of an album was a song from the Prebet Lapok soundtrack album titled Kasih Sayang.

After her involvement in the film, her singing talent attracted the attention of the famous composer and album producer at that time, Ahmad Nawab. After passing the audition process, her finally signed a contract as an artist under the label WEA Records (Malaysia) Sdn. Bhd. in 1980. In 1981, her debut album called 'Kau Pergi Jua' was successfully published by the composer, Akbar Nawab.

Her name has been mentioned along with the popularity of the songs Wajahmu di Mana-Mana, Dewi Dewi, Sireh Pinang and others. Her presence as a singer was very encouraging when the sales of her debut album recorded a relatively high collection at the time and received the "Silver Disc" award.

Success as a singer 
Her artistic journey as a singer continues to be successful. For about 10 years under the WEA Records label, he managed to record 9 full albums (including two studio albums by Ahmad Fauzee featuring their singing together). In addition, she has recorded several songs with other artists.

Until now, she has not recorded a new album but is still active singing for certain events. Sometimes, she will appear on television screens or performance stages if there is an event that requires her services. There are also reports that she will return to record songs. Throughout her career as a singer, she has colored the country's music industry with her singing talent. She is also considered a versatile singer because of her ability to perform any type of song very well.

The abilities her possessed were praised by Saloma and Rafeah Buang during their lifetime. Indeed, she is one of the few singers who really have qualities that need to be defended as singers throughout the ages. A certain party also needs to play a role to elevate her as a supporter of the country's singer who became the pride after Sharifah Aini. In the 80s, Azlina's name was in line with great regional singers who have powerful vocals such as fellow countrymen Francissca Peter, Zaiton Sameon, Khatijah Ibrahim, Dayangku Intan, Sheila Majid and Ramlah Ram, Rahimah Rahim and Anita Sarawak (Singapore) and Hetty Koes Endang, Titi DJ, Vina Panduwinata and Ruth Sahanaya (Indonesia). She was nominated in the Berita Harian Popular Star Award in 1987 for the Popular Female Singer category.

Azlina also appeared on the popular entertainment program Mekar Sejambak produced by RTM in the mid-80s together with other popular entertainers including Ahmad Fauzee and Uji Rashid.

Discography

Soundtrack album 
 Dunia Ana Yang Punya (1979)

Studio album 
 Kau Pergi Jua (1981)
 Malu-Malu Sayang (1981)
 Bayang-Bayang (1983)
 Duniaku (1984)
 Mencari Mimpi (1986)
 Seikhlas Mana Hatimu (1987)
 Mengenang Aziz Jaafar & Normadiah (1988)
 Mengenang Aziz Jaafar & Normadiah Vol. II (1990)
 Di Sini Buat Pertama Kali (1990)

Others 
 Riang Ria Hari Raya (1985)
 Hitam Putih Kehidupan (1987)
 Gema Hari Raya (1989)
 Suara Hati (1991)
 Suara Hati II (1992)
 Seikhlas Budi Aidilfitri (1994)
 R.A.P. '96 (1996)
 Adnan Vs. Azlan Abu Hassan Pasti Hits! (2002)

Compilation album 
 Nostalgia Azlina Aziz Vol. 1 (1994)
 Nostalgia Azlina Aziz Vol. 2 (1994)
 Memori Hit (2009)
 Terbaik (2010)
 Biografi (2011)
 Kenangan Abadi (2011)

Album that she had joined 
 Ahmad Fauzee (1987)
 Siapa Punya (1987)
 Liza (1992)

Filmography

Film

References 

1962 births
Malaysian people of Malay descent
Living people
Malaysian women pop singers
Malaysian actresses
Malaysian people of Indonesian descent
Malaysian Muslims
Malaysian rhythm and blues singers